Good Fruit is the fourth and final studio album by American band Teen. It was released in March 2019 under Carpark Records.

Track listing

References

2019 albums
Teen (band) albums
Carpark Records albums